Stade Municipal is a football stadium in Rumelange, in south-western Luxembourg.  It is currently the home stadium of US Rumelange.  The stadium has a capacity of 2,950.

References

External links
World Stadiums - Luxembourg

Municipal, Rumelange
Rumelange